Gardenia is a genus of flowering plants in the coffee family, Rubiaceae, native to the tropical and subtropical regions of Africa, Asia, Madagascar and Pacific Islands, and Australia.

The genus was named by Carl Linnaeus and John Ellis after Alexander Garden (1730–1791), a Scottish-born American naturalist.

Description

The flowers are solitary or in small clusters, white, or pale yellow, with a tubular-based corolla (botany) with 5–12 lobes (petals) from  diameter. Flowering is from about mid-spring to mid-summer, and many species are strongly scented.

Phytochemistry
Many of the native gardenias of the Pacific Islands and elsewhere in the paleotropics possess a diverse array of natural products.  Methoxylated and oxygenated flavonols, flavones, and triterpenes accumulate on the vegetative- and floral-buds as yellow to brown droplets of secreted resin. Many focused phytochemical studies of these bud exudates have been published, including a population-level study of two rare, sympatric species of the Fiji Islands, G. candida and G. grievei.  
The evolutionary significance of the gums and resins of gardenias in attracting or repelling invertebrate herbivores, has yet to be explored by ecologists.

Systematics 
 Plants of the World Online recognises 128 species in this genus, as follows:

 Gardenia actinocarpa 
 Gardenia anapetes 
 Gardenia angkorensis 
 Gardenia annamensis 
 Gardenia aqualla 
 Gardenia archboldiana 
 Gardenia aubryi 
 Gardenia barnesii 
 Gardenia beamanii 
 Gardenia boninensis 
 Gardenia brachythamnus 
 Gardenia brevicalyx 
 Gardenia brighamii 
 Gardenia buffalina 
 Gardenia cambodiana 
 Gardenia candida 
 Gardenia carinata 
 Gardenia carstensensis 
 Gardenia chanii 
 Gardenia chevalieri 
 Gardenia clemensiae 
 Gardenia collinsiae 
 Gardenia cornuta 
 Gardenia coronaria 
 Gardenia costulata 
 Gardenia crameri 
 Gardenia cuneata 
 Gardenia dacryoides 
 Gardenia elata 
 Gardenia epiphytica 
 Gardenia erubescens 
 Gardenia esculenta 
 Gardenia ewartii 
 Gardenia faucicola 
 Gardenia fiorii 
 Gardenia flava 
 Gardenia fosbergii 
 Gardenia fucata 
 Gardenia fusca 
 Gardenia gardneri 
 Gardenia gjellerupii 
 Gardenia gordonii 
 Gardenia grievei 
 Gardenia griffithii 
 Gardenia gummifera 
 Gardenia hageniana 
 Gardenia hainanensis 
 Gardenia hansemannii 
 Gardenia hillii 
 Gardenia hutchinsoniana 
 Gardenia imperialis 
 Gardenia invaginata 
 Gardenia ixorifolia 
 Gardenia jabiluka 
 Gardenia jasminoides 
 Gardenia kabaenensis 
 Gardenia kakaduensis 
 Gardenia kamialiensis 
 Gardenia lacciflua 
 Gardenia lamingtonii 
 Gardenia lanutoo 
 Gardenia latifolia 
 Gardenia leopoldiana 
 Gardenia leschenaultii 
 Gardenia longistipula 
 Gardenia magnifica 
 Gardenia mannii 
 Gardenia manongarivensis 
 Gardenia maugaloae 
 Gardenia megasperma 
 Gardenia moszkowskii 
 Gardenia mutabilis 
 Gardenia nitida 
 Gardenia obtusifolia 
 Gardenia ornata 
 Gardenia oudiepe 
 Gardenia ovularis 
 Gardenia pallens 
 Gardenia panduriformis 
 Gardenia papuana 
 Gardenia philastrei 
 Gardenia posoquerioides 
 Gardenia propinqua 
 Gardenia psidioides 
 Gardenia pterocalyx 
 Gardenia pyriformis 
 Gardenia racemulosa 
 Gardenia reflexisepala 
 Gardenia reinwardtiana 
 Gardenia remyi 
 Gardenia resinifera 
 Gardenia resiniflua 
 Gardenia resinosa 
 Gardenia rupicola 
 Gardenia rutenbergiana 
 Gardenia sambiranensis 
 Gardenia saxatilis 
 Gardenia scabrella 
 Gardenia schlechteri 
 Gardenia schwarzii 
 Gardenia sericea 
 Gardenia similis 
 Gardenia siphonocalyx 
 Gardenia sokotensis 
 Gardenia sootepensis 
 Gardenia stenophylla 
 Gardenia storckii 
 Gardenia subacaulis 
 Gardenia subcarinata 
 Gardenia taitensis 
 Gardenia tannaensis 
 Gardenia ternifolia 
 Gardenia tessellaris 
 Gardenia thailandica 
 Gardenia thunbergia 
 Gardenia tinneae 
 Gardenia transvenulosa 
 Gardenia trochainii 
 Gardenia tropidocarpa 
 Gardenia truncata 
 Gardenia tubifera 
 Gardenia urvillei 
 Gardenia vernicosa 
 Gardenia vilhelmii 
 Gardenia vitiensis 
 Gardenia vogelii 
 Gardenia volkensii 
 Gardenia vulcanica

Cultivation and uses
Gardenia plants are prized for the strong sweet scent of their flowers, which can be very large in size in some species.

Gardenia jasminoides (syn. G. grandiflora, G. Florida) is cultivated as a house plant. This species can be difficult to grow because it originated in warm humid tropical areas. It demands high humidity to thrive, and bright (but not direct) light. It flourishes in acidic soils with good drainage and thrives on [20-23 C temperatures (68-74 F)] during the day and 15-16 C (60 F) in the evening. Potting soils developed especially for gardenias are available. G. jasminoides grows no larger than 18 inches in height and width when grown indoors. In climates where it can be grown outdoors, it can attain a height of 6 feet. If water touches the flowers, they will turn brown.

Its fruit is used as a yellow dye, used on fabric and food (including the Korean mung bean jelly called hwangpomuk). Its fruits are also used in traditional Chinese medicine for their clearing, calming, and cooling properties.

In France, gardenias are the flower traditionally worn by men as boutonnière when in evening dress. In The Age of Innocence, Edith Wharton suggests it was customary for upper-class men from New York City to wear a gardenia in their buttonhole during the Gilded Age.

Sigmund Freud remarked to the poet H.D. that gardenias were his favorite flower.

In Tiki culture, "Donn Beach", aka Don the Beachcomber, frequently wore a fresh lei of gardenias almost every day at his Tiki bars, allegedly spending $7,800 for flowers over the course of four years in 1938. He named one of his drinks the Mystery Gardenia cocktail. Trader Vic frequently used the gardenia as a flower garnish in his Tiki drinks, such as in the Scorpion and Outrigger Tiara cocktails.

Several species occur in Hawaii, where gardenias are known as nau or nānū.

Crocetin is a chemical compound usually obtained from Crocus sativus, which can also be obtained from the fruit of Gardenia jasminoides.  Gordonin is a novel methoxylated flavonol secreted in golden-colored resinous droplets of Gardenia gordonii, which is one of several critically endangered species of the Fiji Islands.  Phytochemical studies of these resin droplets have been published, including a population-level study of two other rare, sympatric species on Vanua Levu Island of the Fiji Archipelago, G. candida and G. grievei.

Hattie McDaniel famously wore gardenias in her hair when she accepted an Academy Award, the first for an African American, for Gone with the Wind. Mo'Nique Hicks later wore gardenias in her hair when she won her Oscar as a tribute to McDaniel.

Gallery

References

External links

 World Checklist of Rubiaceae

 
Rubiaceae genera